The 19th Arkansas Infantry Regiment was the designation of several units of the Confederate Army during the American Civil War. They were :

 19th (Dawson's) Arkansas Infantry Regiment, formed November 1861. In November 1863 it was consolidated to form the 8/19 AIR
 19th Arkansas Infantry Regiment (Dockery's), formed April 1862, finished at Vicksburg July 1863
 19th Arkansas Infantry Regiment (Hardy's), formed February 1863, it was consolidated in April 1864

Military units and formations disambiguation pages